Greek-Iranian relations are foreign relations between Greece and Iran. The two countries have had relations for thousands of years, and share great historical and cultural ties. Relations have been largely strained though. Greece has an embassy in Tehran, and Iran is represented by its embassy in Athens. Greece was one of the few countries to support the assassination of Qasem Soleimani. In response  Iran threatened Greece with retaliation if it allows the United States to use their military bases in case of a conflict between the United States and Iran. 

Greece has been consistently among the countries with the most unfavorable views of Iran. In 2014 73% of Greeks expressed negative views of Iran, while only 19% viewed it favorably.

History

Ancient

Relations between the two people date back from antiquity and well before the Persian invasion of Greece. By the late 6th century BC, the Achaemenid Persian Empire was in control over all of Asia Minor (which included many ethnically Greek areas), as well as many of the Greek islands, Thrace, and the kingdom of Macedonia, the latter two which make up large parts of modern-day northern Greece. There is also the report by Strabo of an Athenian delegation to Persia in 432 BC.

The relations have evolved from sworn rivalry during the Greco-Persian wars to strong cordiality, since Alexander the Great defeated the Persian Empire. Alexander admired Persian culture, and wanted to create a mixture of Greek and Persian culture which would forever bind and commemorate the two peoples.

This legacy of strong cordiality would thus be found back for many more centuries in various parts of the world named as the Greco-Persian culture. A harmonious blend of both Greek and Persian cultural aspects. The Kingdom of Pontus was a prime example of an entity (in Asia Minor) where Iranian and Greek culture, ethnicity, identity, amongst others, mingled.

Medieval

The Sasanian Empire and Byzantine Empire (which was Greek-speaking) were the main powers in southern Europe, Western Asia, and Central Asia. There were many conflicts between them.

Modern
There is a small Christian Greek community in Iran. In Tehran, there is a Greek Orthodox church which opens mostly during the Greek Holy Week.

In February 2016, the then Greek Prime Minister Alexis Tsipras traveled to Tehran, becoming the first Western leader to visit Iran after the Joint Comprehensive Plan of Action was signed. Tsipras met the Iranian President Hassan Rouhani and pledged that his country would become an energy, economic and trade bridge between Iran and the European Union.

In January 2020, the Greek PM Kyriakos Mitsotakis stated that "Greece supports the decision of the USA for the assassination of Qasem Soleimani" causing an official protest by Iran. While the Greek opposition condemned the killing of Soleimani.

During the COVID-19 pandemic, Greece donated 200,000 vaccines to Iran.

In May 2022, Iranian soldiers seized two Greek tankers and took the crew hostage at the Persian Gulf. This move was a punitive action after Greek authorities confiscated Iranian oil held on a Russian-operated ship docked at a port in Greece a month ago, due to European Union sanctions against Russia for the 2022 Russian invasion of Ukraine.

On June 8, 2022, a Greek court overruled an earlier court order that authorized the United States to seize part of an Iranian oil cargo aboard an Iranian-flagged tanker off the Greek coast.

On June 14, 2022, The Iranian-flagged Lana tanker ship, which was held by Greece in April, has been released and its oil cargo will be returned to its owner, according to Iran's Ports and Maritime Organization (PMO).

On July 2nd, 2022, An Iranian-flagged tanker that Greece seized in April, with the United States seizing some of its cargo, was being towed to the port of Piraeus.

Diplomacy

Hellenic Republic
Tehran (Embassy)

Islamic Republic of Iran
Athens (Embassy)

See also 
 Foreign relations of Greece
 Foreign relations of Iran
 Iran–EU relations

References

External links 
 Greek Ministry of Foreign Affaires about relations with Iran
  Iranian embassy in Athens

 
Iran
Greece